The Duckport Canal was an unsuccessful military venture by Union forces during the Vicksburg campaign of the American Civil War. Ordered built in late March 1863 by Major General Ulysses S. Grant, the canal stretched from the Mississippi River near Duckport, Louisiana, to New Carthage, Louisiana, and utilized a series of swampy bayous for much of its path. It was intended to provide a water-based supply route for a southward movement against the Confederate-held city of Vicksburg, Mississippi, as high water levels made overland travel difficult. Manual digging was provided by 3,500 soldiers from Grant's army and was finished on April 12. The next day, the levee separating the canal cut and the Mississippi River was breached, and water flowed into the canal. Grant moved men and supplies through the overland route, which had been made more accessible by the same falling water levels that doomed the canal. After some inland maneuvering and a lengthy siege, Vicksburg surrendered on July 4, marking a significant turning point in the war.

Background

During the opening days of the American Civil War in 1861, the Anaconda Plan to defeat the Confederate States of America was developed by Commanding General of the United States Army Winfield Scott. A key component of the Anaconda Plan was controlling the Mississippi River, which would cut the Confederacy in two as well as provide an outlet for American goods to be exported. In early 1862, Union forces captured New Orleans, and Union Navy elements moved upriver to Confederate-held Vicksburg, Mississippi. Vicksburg was the last Confederate position remaining on the Mississippi River at this time. Union vessels bombarded the city beginning in late May, but were unable to force it into submission. A joint army-navy force moved against the city again in June. Union infantry began construction on what became known as Grant's Canal in hopes of creating a waterway that would bypass Vicksburg, but the project was abandoned in late July.

Beginning in late November, Union forces led by Major General Ulysses S. Grant advanced overland on Vicksburg from the north, but were forced to retreat after their supply lines were wrecked by Confederate cavalry.  Another prong led by Major General William T. Sherman traveled down the Mississippi River closer to Vicksburg before attacking, but was repulsed at the Battle of Chickasaw Bayou.  Grant again took command of efforts against the city in January 1863, troops having arrived in the area by then.  Confederate defenses of the city were too strong for a direct assault, the ground north of Vicksburg would greatly hamper maneuvers, and retreating north to begin another overland campaign would be considered a retreat by the general public.  Work on the old Grant's Canal resumed that month, but the project was fraught with difficulties and was abandoned in March as unsuccessful.  Work began on another canal at Lake Providence known as the Lake Providence Canal in February.  This canal was delayed by flooding after the levee separating the Mississippi River and the lake was breached, and was eventually abandoned in late March, as Grant shifted his focus to other plans; it had also seen difficulties with trees blocking the channel. Two attempts to weave through the waterways around the city, the Yazoo Pass Expedition and the Steele's Bayou Expedition, also failed.

Canal

Grant decided on March 27 to inquire about the potential of another canal.  The idea was to cut a canal from the Mississippi River near Duckport, Louisiana, to eventually connect with Walnut Bayou, creating a waterway to New Carthage, Louisiana.  The proposed passage was surveyed by United States Army Corps of Engineers officer John W. Cornyn and 300 men. On March 29, Grant ordered troops to march down the west side of the Mississippi River to New Carthage; the Duckport Canal could be used to run a supply line from Milliken's Bend, Louisiana, down to New Carthage as the single road to New Carthage was unreliable due to high water levels.  A canal along the path could particularly be used to supply Union troops marching overland to New Carthage.

Historian Donald L. Miller describes the path of the canal as going from the Mississippi River into Walnut Bayou and then Roundaway Bayou, re-entering the Mississippi River near New Carthage; historians John D. Winters and Terry L. Jones state that the path would go from the Mississippi River into Big Bayou, then Willow Bayou, then Roundaway Bayou, and then Bayou Vidal before re-entering the Mississippi River at New Carthage. Several trees had grown up in these swampy bayous and would need to be cleared out before the waterways could be used. Historian Shelby Foote suggests that Grant had "no great hope that much would come of the enterprise", as only light-draft ships would be able to go through the canal.  Union officer Lucius Hubbard also noted that the project was "undertaken with a somewhat subdued enthusiasm".

He also notes that a further  would be required to reach Roundaway Bayou.

Digging for the canal began on March 31.  Colonel George G. Pride led the work party, with Captain F. E. Prime providing assistance. Lieutenant William Le Baron Jenney was in charge of some engineering aspects.  The canal work force was initially 1,000 soldiers, but this was increased to 3,500, with others at work further down the bayou system.  Some of the workers came from Bissell's Engineer Regiment.  The men working on the canal gave it the nickname "Pride's Ditch".  The soldiers' daily work routine was to leave for the canal site at 7:30 am and start to return to camp at 6:00 pm.  The workers were disturbed by fewer insects than expected and lived well off of the food available in the area.  Venomous snakes falling from overhanging branches onto the soldiers' rafts remained an issue.  Work on the canal was about halfway completed by April 6, and was mostly done by April 11.  Manual digging was completed the next day, and the levee holding back the Mississippi was cut on April 13. At the time the levee was cut, the obstructions had been cleared to within  of Richmond, Louisiana. Four dredges were brought in to deepen the channel, and more soldiers worked to clear stumps and trees.  Swing saws placed on rafts were used to cut underwater trees.

After the levee was cut, Pride estimated that only four more days of work were needed, although it was noted that the water in the bayous was rising slower than expected. When the transport Silver Wave entered the lower end of Bayou Vidal on April 18 to scout the pathway, she was unable to do so due to low water and trees.  Grant inspected the canal that day, which also saw the level of the Mississippi River begin to fall.  Four days later, a tugboat entered the bayous via the cut at the upper (north) end of the canal.  Tree and stump clearing continued through April 23.  The Mississippi River dropped  in a matter of days, and there was soon only  of water in part of the canal.  The project was abandoned on May 4.  The tugboat Victor was the only ship to successfully make it all the way to New Carthage through the canal.  Two of the dredges and 20 other boats became grounded in the mud, where they were left to rot.

Aftermath
The Duckport Canal was the last canal attempted by Grant during the Vicksburg campaign.  The falling waters that had hampered the canal also opened up the overland route, allowing Grant to use it on a larger scale to bring men and supplies to New Carthage.  The Union Navy had also determined that ships could pass the Vicksburg batteries with little risk of major hull damage by hugging the Mississippi shore of the river.  On April 30, Grant landed troops on the Vicksburg side of the Mississippi, downriver from the city and the Confederate position at Grand Gulf.  The next day, Union forces began the move inland.  After fighting the Battle of Raymond in mid-May, Grant swung his army to strike Jackson, Mississippi, which was taken by the Union on May 14.  Turning west, Grant's army defeated the Confederates at the battles of Champion Hill and Big Black River Bridge, and the Siege of Vicksburg began on May 18.   Union frontal attacks on May 19 and May 22 were repulsed, and the siege dragged on until the Confederates, isolated and starving, surrendered on July 4.  For the Confederacy, the capture of Vicksburg was a major blow and was a significant factor in the eventual Union victory.  Jones writes that the Duckport Canal, like Grant's Canal, could have been successful with better conditions from the Mississippi River.  Little is left of the path of the Duckport Canal. As of 2016, it was commemorated by a historic marker in Madison Parish, Louisiana.

References

Sources
 
 
 
 
 
 
  
 
 

 
 
 
  

Vicksburg campaign
Canals in Louisiana
Louisiana in the American Civil War